The Coherent Electromagnetic Radio Tomography (CERTO) is a radio beacon which measures ionospheric parameters in coordination with ground receivers. CERTO provides global ionospheric maps to aid prediction of radio wave scattering. CERTO was developed by the Naval Research Lab and is one of the 4 experiment packages aboard the PicoSAT satellite. CERTO provides near–real-time measurements of the ionosphere. CERTO was used for the Equatorial Vortex Experiment in 2013.

Specifications
NSSDC ID: 2001-043B-01A
Mission: PicoSAT 9

References

NASA: Picosat Experiment 2001-43B
Kirtland AFB CERTO

Space science experiments
Ionosphere
Satellite meteorology
Radio technology